Mark Washington may refer to:
Mark Washington (Canadian football) (born 1973), defensive coordinator for the Hamilton Tiger-Cats
Mark Washington (linebacker) (born 1985), American football player 
Mark Washington (cornerback) (born 1947), American football cornerback